{{Album ratings
|rev1 = AllMusic
|rev1score = <ref name="Allmusic">{{cite web | url = https://www.allmusic.com/album/ultimate-collection-mw0000739525 | title = Days Of Innocence - The Ultimate Collection - Moving Pictures  | publisher = AllMusic | accessdate = 22 December 2019 }}</ref>
}}Days Of Innocence - The Ultimate Collection is a compilation album by the Australian rock band Moving Pictures, released in 2000.

The compilation — the band's first greatest hits album — consists of the entire original 1981 album Days of Innocence, plus bonus tracks featuring the band's successive singles, as well as several tracks from the band's second album Matinee.  The collection also features Moving Pictures' 1984 contribution to the Footloose'' soundtrack, "Never," written by lyricist Dean Pitchford and composer Michael Gore.

Track listing

References

Moving Pictures (band) albums
2000 compilation albums
Compilation albums by Australian artists
Albums produced by Charles Fisher (producer)